Lothar Knörzer (born 4 August 1933, in Karlsruhe) is a West German athlete who competed mainly in the 100 metres.

He competed for the United Team of Germany in the 1956 Summer Olympics held in Melbourne in the 4 x 100-metre relay where he won the bronze medal with his team mates Leonhard Pohl, Heinz Fütterer and Manfred Germar.

References

1933 births
Living people
German male sprinters
Athletes (track and field) at the 1956 Summer Olympics
Olympic athletes of the United Team of Germany
Olympic bronze medalists for the United Team of Germany
Medalists at the 1956 Summer Olympics
Sportspeople from Karlsruhe
Olympic bronze medalists in athletics (track and field)